This is a list of the coaches of the Ottawa Hockey Club, later known as the Ottawa Senators, which existed from 1883. The list does not include coaches of the NHL franchise after it moved from Ottawa, or the Senators hockey team which existed from 1934 until 1954.

Pre-NHL era

In this early era, the captain of the club was the coach. No other individual was hired by the club.

 Captains
Frank Jenkins 1883–1886, 1889–1890
 Thomas D. Green, 1886–1887
 P. D. Ross, 1890–91
Bert Russel 1891–1893
 Weldy Young, 1893–1895
 Chauncey Kirby, 1895–96
 Fred Chittick, 1896–97
 Harvey Pulford, 1897–98
 Chauncey Kirby, 1898–99
 Hod Stuart, 1899–1900
 Harvey Pulford, 1900–1901
 William Duval, 1902

Coaches
 Alf Smith (1901, 1903–1906) (playing coach from 1904–1906)
 Pete Green (1902, 1907–1913) 
 Alf Smith (1913–1917)

NHL era

This is a list of head coaches for the original Ottawa Senators club of the National Hockey League. This list does not include the current NHL Ottawa Senators.

Eddie Gerard (1916–1918) (playing coach)
Harry Hyland (1918) (playing coach)
Alf Smith (1918-1919)
Pete Green (1919–1925)
Alex Currie (1925–1926)
Dave Gill (1926–1929)
Newsy Lalonde (1929–1930)
Newsy Lalonde and Dave Gill (1930–31)
Cy Denneny (1932–1933)
George Boucher (1933–1934)

See also
List of NHL head coaches
List of NHL players

References

 

   
 
head coaches